Hollywood Bound is a 1946 American musical comedy film directed by Sam White, Alf Goulding, and Leigh Jason, from a screenplay written by Joseph A. Fields, John Grey, Ernest Pagano, and Leigh Jason.  The film stars Betty Grable, is the compilation of three short films made by Grable over a decade earlier: "Ferry-Go-Round" in 1934, and "A Night at the Biltmore Bowl" and "The Spirit of 1976", both in 1935.

Cast

"Ferry-Go-Round"

"A Night at the Biltmore Bowl"

"The Spirit of 1976"

References

1946 musical comedy films
American musical comedy films
Films directed by Leigh Jason
1940s American films